

Buildings and structures

Buildings

 104–106 – Alcántara Bridge across the Tagus is Spain is built by order of Trajan.
 113 – Trajan's Column in Rome is completed.
 122 – Construction of Hadrian's Wall in Britain begun.
 c. 128 – Pantheon in Rome is completed.
 129/130 – Arch of Hadrian in modern Jerash, Jordan is completed.
 132 – Temple of Olympian Zeus, Athens, begun around 520 BC, is completed.
 134 – Ponte Sant'Angelo in Rome is completed.
 180–200 – Porta Nigra in Trier, Germania, is constructed.
 year unknown – Kallanai Dam (Grand Anaicut) in Tamil Nadu is completed.

References

Architecture